The , also called  or  was a type of the 1st class submarine in the Imperial Japanese Navy serving during the Second World War.

The , also called {{nihongo|Type-D Modified submarine|丁型改潜水艦|Tei-gata Kai sensuikan}} was different from the I-361 class, however since the I-373 was a development form of the I-361 class, this article describes both of them.

Construction
After the Battle of Midway the IJN immediately planned a transport submarine. The type was based on the U 155 Deutschland. Her duties were transportation of troops (110 men, 10 tons freight and two landing craft) in the areas where the enemy had air superiority. Later the demands for her were changed in sequence. The final demands were 65 tons in the hull and 25 tons on the upper deck (freight only). In the beginning the IJN did not intend to arm these boats with torpedoes. Later, after strong demands from the front commanders, it was decided to arm them with torpedoes for self-defense. The I-372 class was designed as a tanker submarine based on the I-361 class. They were not allowed to be loaded with torpedoes.

Service
In 1944, the submarines were tasked with transport missions between from mainland Japan to remote islands. They had little success and suffered great losses. Of the 13 submarines, only four survived the war.

Kaiten missions
Their deck guns were removed and fittings for five Kaitens were installed on their decks.

Assigned to the Todoroki group on 28 May 1945, sank (or damaged) one motor ship on 15 June 1945.

Assigned to the Tamon group on 1 August 1945, no success.

Assigned to the Tamon group on 19 July 1945, no success.

Assigned to the Chihaya group on 20 February 1945, no success.

Class variants
The Type-D submarines were divided into four classes: 
 
 
 
 . The 2968th vessel class boats were not built and remained only a design.

I-361 class

I-372 class
Project number S51B. She was going to become a lead ship of the Modified Type D submarines (I-373 class), at first. However, the IJN wanted a submarine as soon as possible. She was built as a tanker submarine according to revised I-361 drawings.

I-373 class
Project number S51C. Improved model of the I-361 class. Furthermore, the IJN was planned reinforced model of the I-373 class, also. However all of them were cancelled.

Footnotes

Bibliography
 

, History of Pacific War Vol.17 I-Gō Submarines, Gakken (Japan), January 1998, 
, History of Pacific War Vol.36 Kairyū and Kaiten, Gakken (Japan), May 2002, 
, History of Pacific War Vol.62 Ships of The Imperial Japanese Forces, Gakken (Japan), January 2008, 
, History of Pacific War Vol.63 Documents of IJN submarines and USN submarines, Gakken (Japan), January 2008, 
The Maru Special, Japanese Naval Vessels No.43 Japanese Submarines III, Ushio Shobō (Japan), September 1980, Book code 68343-43
 Senshi Sōsho Vol.88, Naval armaments and war preparation (2), "And after the outbreak of war", Asagumo Simbun (Japan), October 1975

See also
Type 4 Ka-Tsu

Submarine classes
Merchant submarines
 
Submarines of the Imperial Japanese Navy